Shane Demond Youman (born October 11, 1979) is an American former  professional baseball pitcher. He played parts of two seasons in Major League Baseball for the Pittsburgh Pirates.

Youman stands at 6' 4", and weighs 220 pounds. Youman is a classic "crafty" left-handed pitcher, with a fastball in the 84-88 MPH range and a hard slider, as well as a changeup.

Career 
He attended Louisiana State. He made his major league debut for the Pittsburgh Pirates on September 10, 2006. He got his first career win on July 3, 2007 against the Milwaukee Brewers.

Youman was claimed off waivers by the Philadelphia Phillies on November 28, 2007. On March 19, 2008, he was sent outright to the minors, but was released in early June. Shortly thereafter, Youman signed with the Lancaster Barnstormers of the Atlantic League, where he made his debut on June 16, 2008. He remained in the Atlantic League for parts of four seasons, pitching for five teams.

On August 10, 2011 after pitching 13 games that season for the Long Island Ducks, Youman's contract was purchased by the Lamigo Monkeys in Taiwan. In January 2012, with the help of the Global Scouting Bureau, Youman signed a one-year contract to pitch for the Lotte Giants of the Korea Professional Baseball League.

New Iberia Senior High School held a ceremony to retire Youman's number on March 18, 2017. In front of a crowd that included Youman's family, friends, and former coaches, the school presented him with a framed jersey.

References

External links 

Career statistics and player information from Korea Baseball Organization

1979 births
Living people
African-American baseball players
Águilas Cibaeñas players
American expatriate baseball players in the Dominican Republic
Altoona Curve players
American expatriate baseball players in Mexico
American expatriate baseball players in South Korea
American expatriate baseball players in Taiwan
Baseball players from Louisiana
Bridgeport Bluefish players
Cangrejeros de Santurce (baseball) players
Caribes de Anzoátegui players
Hanwha Eagles players
Hickory Crawdads players
Indianapolis Indians players
KBO League pitchers
Lamigo Monkeys players
Lancaster Barnstormers players
Leones de Yucatán players
Leones del Caracas players
American expatriate baseball players in Venezuela
Liga de Béisbol Profesional Roberto Clemente pitchers
Lobos de Arecibo players
Long Island Ducks players
Lotte Giants players
Louisiana State University alumni
LSU Tigers baseball players
Lynchburg Hillcats players
Major League Baseball pitchers
Mexican League baseball pitchers
Newark Bears players
People from New Iberia, Louisiana
Peoria Saguaros players
Pittsburgh Pirates players
Reading Phillies players
Williamsport Crosscutters players
York Revolution players
21st-century African-American sportspeople
20th-century African-American sportspeople